Mokgeteng John Mashego (born 3 January 1951) is a South African golfer who was the first black player to win a tournament on the Southern African Tour after it lifted its whites-only rule. His victory came at the 1991 Bushveld Classic, where he defeated Steve van Vuuren and Ian Palmer in a playoff.

Mashego was born in White River, Mpumalanga, South Africa. He has played more than two hundred and fifty events on the tour, but he hasn't won again, the rules having been changed too late to allow him to play on the tour through his prime, though he finished sole or tied second in at least three more tournaments, including the Cock of the North event as late as 2000-01. Since 2002 he has played on the European Seniors Tour, where his best finish is second.

Professional wins (1)

Sunshine Tour wins (1)
1991 Bushveld Classic

Notes

External links

South African male golfers
Sunshine Tour golfers
European Senior Tour golfers
1951 births
Living people